Carbo or accented Carbó may refer to

Places
Carbó Municipality, a municipality in Sonora, Mexico
Carbó, the municipal seat of Carbó Municipality, Sonora, Mexico
Enrique Carbó, Argentina, a village and municipality in Entre Ríos Province, Argentina
Pedro Carbo Canton, a canton in Guayas Province, Ecuador
Pedro Carbo, the municipal seat of Pedro Carbo Canton

People

In Ancient Rome
Papirius Carbo, an ancient Roman family
Gaius Papirius Carbo (consul 120 BC) ( 163–119 BC), Roman statesman and orator

Contemporary
Agustín Carbó, Puerto Rican energy and environmental attorney
Bernie Carbo (born 1947), American Major League baseball player
Chuck Carbo (1926–2008), American R&B singer
Frankie Carbo (1904–1976), New York City Mafia soldier in the Lucchese crime family
Juan José Carbó (1927–2010), Spanish cartoonist
Nick DeCarbo (1910–1991), American football player
Raúl Baca Carbo (1931–2014), Ecuadorian engineer and politician
Victoria Carbó (born 1963), Argentine field hockey player
Willy Carbo (born 1959), Dutch football player

i Carbo
Artur Mundet i Carbó (1879-1965), Catalan businessman based in Mexico
Quima Jaume i Carbó (1934–1993), Catalan Spanish poet
Ramon Casas i Carbo (1866-1932), Catalan Spanish artist

See also

Calbo (disambiguation)
Carlo (name)